Shirakiopsis indica, is a mangrove species in the family Euphorbiaceae. Its fruits and seeds are very poisonous and are used as a fish poison. A decoction of the root bark possesses purgative and emetic properties and is said to be used in insanity and hydrophobia.

References

Hippomaneae
Flora of tropical Asia
Plants described in 1805